Sangeeta Niranjan is an Indo-Fijian businesswoman.  She is the  co-founder of Kenns Motors, the President of the Fiji Motor Traders Association, and a former President of the Fiji Employers Federation, a position to which she was elected on 3 September 2005.  She resigned from this position on 30 October 2006 for personal reasons.

References

External links

Fijian businesspeople
Fijian people of Indian descent
People from Suva
University of the South Pacific alumni
Year of birth missing (living people)
Living people